Contemporary Jewry is a peer reviewed academic journal published by the Association for the Social Scientific Study of Jewry since 1977.

The journal mostly publishes articles on the subject of the sociology of Jewry, however, articles on Jews and Judaism based on other social sciences as well as history are published as well.

History
Contemporary Jewry was initially published semiannually from 1977–1985. From 1986–2008, the journal published annually. Since 2009, the journal has published three issues per year. The publication was originally titled Jewish Sociology and Social Research.

References

External links
Contemporary Jewry homepage

English-language journals
Sociology journals
Academic journals associated with learned and professional societies
Triannual journals
Publications established in 1977
1977 establishments in the United States